Occumster was a railway station located between Wick and Lybster, Highland.

History 
The station was opened as part of the Wick and Lybster Railway on 1 July 1903. As with the other stations on the line, the station was closed from 3 April 1944.

References

Notes

Sources 
 
 
 

Disused railway stations in Caithness
Railway stations in Great Britain opened in 1903
Railway stations in Great Britain closed in 1944
William Roberts railway stations
1903 establishments in Scotland
1944 disestablishments in Scotland